Goranci may refer to:

 Gorani people, an ethnic group in Kosovo
 Goranci, Mostar, a village in Bosnia and Herzegovina

See also 
 Gorenci (disambiguation)